NGC 366 is an open cluster located in the constellation Cassiopeia. It was discovered on October 27, 1829 by John Herschel. It was described by Dreyer as a "cluster, small."

See also 
 Open cluster 
 List of NGC objects (1–1000)
 Cassiopeia (constellation)

References

External links 
 
 SEDS

0366
18291027
Cassiopeia (constellation)
Open clusters
Discoveries by John Herschel